The Philippines national under-23 football team represents the Philippines in international football competitions in the Olympic Games, Asian Games, Southeast Asian Games and any other under-23 international football tournaments.  It is controlled by the Philippine Football Federation, the governing body of football in the country.

Competition records

Olympics

AFC U-23 Championship

Asian Games

Southeast Asian Games

AFF U-23 Youth Championship

Schedule and results

2022 AFF U-23 Youth Championship

Friendly

31st Southeast Asian Games

Personnel
Updated as of 2 May 2022

Current technical staff

Management

Coaching history

Players

Current squad

The following players are included in the 20-man squad for the 31st Southeast Asian Games in Vietnam.
Caps and goals updated as of 13 May 2022, after the match against .

Notes
OA Over-aged player

Recent call-ups
 
The following players have been called up for the Philippines U-23 within the past 12 months.

COV Withdrew due to COVID-19 
INJ Withdrew due to an injury 
PRE Included in the preliminary squad 
SUS Serving suspension

Previous squads

See also
 Football in the Philippines

Men's
 Philippines national football team
 Philippines national under-21 football team
 Philippines national under-19 football team
 Philippines national under-17 football team

Women's
 Philippines women's national football team
 Philippines women's national under-20 football team

References

Asian national under-23 association football teams
under-23
U-23